Ancistrus hoplogenys is a species of armored catfish native to Argentina, Brazil, Guyana, Paraguay, Peru, and Uruguay, where it occurs in the basins of the Amazon River, the Essequibo River, and the Paraguay River. It has also been reported from Suriname. This species grows to a length of  SL. In the aquarium hobby, this fish is sometimes known as the spotted or starlight bristlenose pleco, although it may also be referred to by its L-number, which is L059.

References

hoplogenys
Fish of South America
Fish of Argentina
Fish of Brazil
Fish of Guyana
Fish of Paraguay
Fish of Peru
Fish of Suriname
Fish of Uruguay
Fish described in 1864
Taxa named by Albert Günther